De Vuelta y Vuelta is the third album by Spanish Rock group Jarabe de Palo, released in 2001.

Track listing 
 De Vuelta y Vuelta - 5:44
 Tiempo (featuring Vico-C & Jovanotti)- 4:43
 En lo Puro No Hay Futuro - 3:25
 Dos Días en la Vida - 6:21
 La Luz de Tu Corazón - 4:18
 Completo Incompleto - 3:18
 Cara de Azul - 3:49
 Agustito Con la Vida - 3:21
 De los Libros (No Se Aprende) - 3:09
 Viaje Para Locos - 4:23
 Mamá - 7:48

Certifications

References

2001 albums
Jarabe de Palo albums